The 2008 UAE 2nd Speedcar Series round was a Speedcar Series motor race held on 11 and 12 April 2008 at Dubai Autodrome in Dubai, United Arab Emirates. It was the fiveth round of the 2008 Speedcar Series.

Classification

Qualifying

Race 1

Race 2

See also 
 2008 UAE 2nd GP2 Asia Series round

References

Speedcar Series
Speedcar